No. 108 Squadron  (Hawkeyes) was a fighter squadron of Indian Air Force. The squadron was equipped with MiG-21M and was based at Pathankot Air Force Station. The squadron was number plated in December 2017.

History
The Hawk with its keen eyesight depicts search and acquisition of the target. The lightning and the battle axe denote immediate response and power of the strike. The Hawkeye were formed on 20 November 1959 at Halwara. The squadron was equipped with the Vampire aircraft and was allotted the role of Army Cooperation and photo-Reconnaissance.

The squadron was number plated in December 2017.

Assignments
 Liberation of Goa
 Indo-Pakistani War of 1965
 Indo-Pakistani War of 1971

Aircraft
Aircraft types operated by the squadron:

Commanding Officers

References

108